Cassius Fairchild (December 16, 1829 – October 24, 1868) was a Wisconsin businessman, politician, and Union Army officer in the American Civil War.  He was the brother of Lucius Fairchild, the 10th Governor of Wisconsin, and the son of Jairus C. Fairchild, the 1st State Treasurer of Wisconsin.

Early life and career
Born in Franklin Mills, Ohio (now Kent, Ohio), Fairchild was educated mostly in Ohio. His father was Jairus C. Fairchild, who was the first State Treasurer of Wisconsin and the first Mayor of Madison, Wisconsin. Cassius was the second of four sons born to Jairus Fairchild and Mrs. Sally Blair Fairchild—his older brother, Charles, died at age four in 1832.  The family moved to Cleveland two years later, where Cassius received most of his education and upbringing.

At age fourteen, he traveled to the Wisconsin Territory with his uncle, Franklin J. Blair, arriving in the vicinity of Milwaukee.  He decided to enter school in Waukesha, and attended the Prairieville Academy (now Carroll University).  His parents and siblings followed in 1846, settling in Madison, Wisconsin.  Two years later, when Wisconsin became a State, his father, Jairus Fairchild, was elected the first State Treasurer.  Jairus Fairchild invested in cranberry farms, lumber interests, and real estate.  Within a decade, Cassius would be charged with managing these family businesses.

In the 1850s, Cassius Fairchild was elected several times to the Madison City Council, where he served one year as president.  In 1859 he became Chairman of the Democratic Party of Wisconsin, and was elected to represent Madison in the 1860 session of the Wisconsin State Assembly.

Civil War service

Cassius and his brother, Lucius, were volunteers in a Wisconsin militia company known as the Governor's Guard in the late 1850s and gained experience that would become useful in securing leadership positions in the coming war.  At the outbreak of the war, Cassius was busy tending to the family's cranberry fields in the remote north.  After returning home, he immediately offered his services to the governor for the war effort.

In October 1861, Fairchild was appointed major of the 16th Wisconsin Volunteer Infantry Regiment, which was still being organized at the time.  He was promoted to lieutenant colonel in December, and the regiment mustered into federal service a month later, on January 31, 1862.

Shiloh and aftermath
The regiment marched south under Colonel Benjamin Allen on March 16, 1862, and joined Ulysses S. Grant's Army of the Tennessee.  Less than a month later, Fairchild was leading his mostly untrained regiment against a surprise attack in the Battle of Shiloh.  Fairchild was shot in the hip during the first day of fighting, and was forced to return to Wisconsin.  He spent months recuperating, as surgeons attempted to remove the bullet and scraps of cloth that had been dragged into the wound.  During that time, he and his father were bedridden in adjoining rooms—his father died that summer.  The bullet and remaining pieces of material were finally removed by Dr. Brainerd in December 1862, but after months embedded in the bone, there was significant irritation around the wound that would, years later, result in Fairchild's death.

Sherman's Army

After removing the irritants, Lt. Colonel Fairchild was able to recover well enough to rejoin his regiment in May 1863, though still limited in his abilities.  He returned in time to join the regiment at the Siege of Vicksburg.  After Vicksburg, his superior officer, Colonel Allen, chose to retire.  He, too, had been wounded at Shiloh and had not fully recuperated from the wound.  On March 17, 1864, Fairchild was made Colonel of the Regiment.

The Army of the Tennessee was now under William Tecumseh Sherman's command and was engaged in a campaign into the southern heartland.  As Colonel, Fairchild led the regiment through Kennesaw Mountain, the Battle of Atlanta, and Sherman's March to the Sea.  On March 13, 1865, Fairchild was given a brevet to Brigadier General and commanded a Brigade composed of five regiments during the Battle of Bentonville.  A few weeks later, the war ended and Fairchild mustered out of the service.

Postbellum years

Just months after the end of the war, in 1865, Fairchild's brother, Lucius, was elected Governor of Wisconsin.  The following summer, in 1866, Cassius was appointed United States Marshal for Wisconsin by President Andrew Johnson.  He moved to Milwaukee and performed the duties of the office until his death two years later.

On October 15, 1868, he married Mary Cornelia Haney, the daughter of the prominent Milwaukee businessman Robert Haney.  Nine days later, while serving as a pallbearer at the funeral of a friend, his old wound ruptured and he died.

See also

Fairchild family

References

External links
Political Graveyard: Fairchild

|-

Cassius
People from Kent, Ohio
Politicians from Madison, Wisconsin
People of Wisconsin in the American Civil War
Businesspeople from Madison, Wisconsin
Members of the Wisconsin State Assembly
Wisconsin city council members
1829 births
1868 deaths
19th-century American politicians
Union Army colonels
19th-century American businesspeople